Tami Whitlinger-Jones (née Whitlinger; born November 13, 1968) is a former professional tennis player from the United States.

Prior to turning professional, Whitlinger was a two-time All-American at Stanford University. Her first tournament victory as a professional came in 1989 at a USTA Circuit event in Greensboro, North Carolina. Her best result at a Grand Slam event was at the French Open in 1991, where she reached the fourth round. Her career-high singles ranking was world  41.

Whitlinger retired from the professional tour in 1997.

Whitlinger is married to Kelly Jones, another former professional tennis player, who was ranked the world-number-one men's doubles player in 1992.

Tami grew up in Neenah, Wisconsin. Professional tennis runs in her family: her twin sister Teri and her uncle John both played professionally. Tami is also the granddaughter of former professional basketball player Warren Whitlinger.

References

External links
 
 

American female tennis players
Sportspeople from Neenah, Wisconsin
Tennis people from Wisconsin
1968 births
Living people
Stanford Cardinal women's tennis players